Cravencères is a commune in the Gers department in southwestern France.

Geography

Population

Notable people 
The historian and palaeographer Charles Samaran (1879–1982) was born in Cravencères.

See also
Communes of the Gers department

References

Communes of Gers